Science & Society: A Journal of Marxist Thought and Analysis  is a peer-reviewed academic journal of Marxist scholarship. It covers economics, philosophy of science, historiography, women's studies, literature, the arts, and other social science disciplines from a Marxist point of view. As well as covering social and political theory, it includes first-order historical research.

History 
The journal was established in 1936. It is published by Guilford Publications. The editor-in-chief is David Laibman (Brooklyn College).

Abstracting and indexing 
The journal is abstracted and indexed in:

According to the Journal Citation Reports, the journal has a 2013 impact factor of 0.867.

References

External links 
 

Publications established in 1936
English-language journals
Quarterly journals
Marxist journals
Guilford Press academic journals